The Franklin Pierce Cover House is a historic house on North Carolina Route 1388 in the small town of Andrews, North Carolina.  The -story brick Queen Anne Victorian was built in 1900, and is a remnant of Andrews' industrial heritage.  The house was built by Franklin Pierce Cover, owner of a local tannery.  It exhibits the complex massing typical of Queen Anne houses, with multiple gables, projections, and a massive three-story octagonal tower.  Documentary photographs suggest the house once had a Queen Anne porch with brackets and an ornamental frieze, but this was replaced by a more Colonial Revival scheme with heavier Tuscan columns.

The house was listed on the National Register of Historic Places in 1982.

See also
National Register of Historic Places listings in Cherokee County, North Carolina

References

Houses on the National Register of Historic Places in North Carolina
Queen Anne architecture in North Carolina
Houses completed in 1900
Houses in Cherokee County, North Carolina
National Register of Historic Places in Cherokee County, North Carolina